Duck Lake is a lake in Kalamazoo County, Michigan.

References

Lakes of Michigan
Lakes of Kalamazoo County, Michigan